The Swedish Road Workers' Union (SVaf) was a trade union representing road and railway maintenance workers in Sweden.

The union was founded in 1914, as the Swedish Road Construction Workers' Union, a split from the Swedish Factory Workers' Union.  It immediately affiliated to the Swedish Confederation of Trade Unions, and secured its first collective agreement in 1924.  It was originally based in Krylbo, but moved its headquarters to Stockholm in 1939.  Membership peaked that year, at 27,169, then slowly declined.  In 1949, it members involved in construction were transferred to the new Swedish Building Workers' Union.  By 1969, the union had 15,776 members, of whom only 11 were women.  The following year, it merged into the new Swedish National Union of State Employees.

References

Swedish Trade Union Confederation
Trade unions in Sweden
Trade unions established in 1914
Trade unions disestablished in 1970